North Portal is a village in the Canadian province of Saskatchewan within the Rural Municipality of Coalfields No. 4 and Census Division No. 1. It is adjacent to the United States border opposite Portal, North Dakota. The border crossing is considered the major entry point to and from the U.S. within Saskatchewan.

History 
North Portal incorporated as a village on November 16, 1903.

Attractions 
A notable tourist attraction is the Gateway Cities Golf Club, located next to the village. Eight of the course's nine holes are located within Canada, but the course's ninth hole, and the clubhouse, are located in the United States.

Demographics 

See also
 List of communities in Saskatchewan
 List of villages in Saskatchewan

Footnotes

Villages in Saskatchewan
Coalfields No. 4, Saskatchewan
Division No. 1, Saskatchewan